Triloki Ram was an Indian politician and a member of the 16th Legislative Assembly of Uttar Pradesh of India. He represented the Iglas constituency of Uttar Pradesh and was a member of the Rashtriya Lok Dal.

Early life and education
Triloki Ram was born in Nasirpur, Hathras, Uttar Pradesh. He earned a bachelor's degree.

Political career
Triloki Ram was a MLA for one term. He represented the Iglas constituency and was a member of the Rashtriya Lok Dal.

Posts Held

See also
Iglas
Politics of India
Sixteenth Legislative Assembly of Uttar Pradesh
Uttar Pradesh Legislative Assembly

References 

 

Rashtriya Lok Dal politicians
Uttar Pradesh MLAs 2012–2017
People from Hathras district
1948 births
Living people